Microdictyon is an extinct armoured worm-like animal coated with net-like scleritic plates, known from the Early Cambrian Maotianshan shale of Yunnan China and other parts of the world. Microdictyon is part of the ill-defined taxon – Lobopodia – that includes several other odd worm-like animals that resembling worm with legs, such as Hallucigenia, Onychodictyon, Cardiodictyon, Luolishania, and Paucipodia.  The isolated sclerites of Microdictyon are known from other Lower Cambrian deposits.  Microdictyon sclerites appear to have moulted; one sclerite seems to have been preserved during ecdysis.

Microdictyon sinicum (Chen, Hou and Lu, 1989) is typical.  The wormlike animal has ten pairs of sclerites (suggestions that these may be eyes or eye-like structures have no weight) on the sides, matched to a pair of tentacle-like feet below.  The head and posterior are tubular and featureless.

Species composition 

Type species. Microdictyon effusum Bengtson, Matthews et Missarzhevsky, 1981; Lower Cambrian, Atdabanian Stage, Kazakhstan; Atdabanian and Botomian Stages, Russia (Siberian Platform) and England; Lower Cambrian, Sweden.
In addition to the type species, 13 species:
M. anus Tong, 1989, Lower Cambrian, upper Meishucunian Stage (= Atdabanian Stage), China (Shaanxi).
M. chinense Hao et Shu, 1987, Lower Cambrian, Qiongzhusi Stage (= upper Atdabanian-lowermost Botomian Stages), China (Shaanxi); Atdabanian through Botomian stages, Siberian Platform.
M. cuneum Wotte et Sundberg, 2017, Lower Cambrian, Montezuman Stage, the United States.
M. depressum Bengtson, 1990, Lower Cambrian, Atdabanian through Botomian Stages, South Australia.
M. fuchengense Li et Zhu, 2001, Lower Cambrian, upper Meishucunian Stage (Atdabanian Stage), China (Shaanxi).
M. jinshaense Zhang et Aldridge, 2007, Lower Cambrian, Qiongzhusi Stage (= upper Atdabanian Stage-lowermost Botomian), China(Shaanxi).
M. montezumaensis Wotte et Sundberg, 2017, Lower Cambrian, Montezuman Stage, the United States.
M. rhomboidale Bengtson, Matthews et Missarzhevsky, 1986, Lower Cambrian, upper parts of the Atdabanian Stage, Kazakhstan; Atdabanian Stage, Canada, the United States (M. cf. rhomboidale).
M. robisoni Bengtson, Matthews et Missarzhevsky, 1986, Middle Cambrian, Amgan Stage, the United States;
M. rozanovi Demidenko, 2006, Lower Cambrian, Toyonian Stage, Siberian Platform.
M. sinicum Chen, Hou et Lu, 1989, Lower Cambrian, upper Meishucunian Stage (= Atdabanian Stage) Stage, China (Yunnan.
M. sphaeroides Hinz, 1987, Lower Cambrian, Atdabanian Stage, Great Britain.
M. tenuiporatum Bengtson, Matthews et Missarzhevsky, 1986, Lower Cambrian, Atdabanian Stage, Siberian Platform.

A picture can be found at https://web.archive.org/web/20030730043530/http://paws.wcu.edu/dperlmutr/earlyfauna.html.

The name Microdictyon is also used for a genus of green algae.

References

Prehistoric protostome genera
Maotianshan shales fossils
Burgess Shale animals
Paleozoic life of New Brunswick
Paleozoic life of Nova Scotia
Cambrian genus extinctions